Klepp IL is a Norwegian sports club from the municipality of Klepp. It was founded on 1 October 1919, and has sections for football, handball and gymnastics as well as the less active sections for athletics and orienteering.

Best known for their women's football team, Klepp Elite women currently play in the Toppserien, and have the distinction of being in the Norwegian top flight since its inception. Additionally, Klepp Elite have won the league in 1987 and 1989. 
Klepp Elite have also won the National Championship Norgesmester for Junior Girls U19 more than any other club, winning in 2008, 2011, 2016, 2018 and most recently in 2019.
Among its most famous former players are Birthe Hegstad, Dagny Mellgren and Ane Stangeland Horpestad.

The men's football team currently plays in the Third Division (fourth tier), having last played in the Second Division back in 2006.

Gymnast Åge Storhaug was a member of Klepp IL.

Recent seasons 
{|class="wikitable"
|-bgcolor="#efefef"
! Season
! 
! Pos.
! Pl.
! W
! D
! L
! GS
! GA
! P
!Cup
!Notes
|-
|2006
|TS
|align=right |9
|align=right|18||align=right|3||align=right|2||align=right|13
|align=right|17||align=right|60||align=right|11
|quarter-final
|
|-
|2007
|TS
|align=right |7
|align=right|22||align=right|8||align=right|4||align=right|10
|align=right|35||align=right|30||align=right|28
|quarter-final
|
|-
|2008
|TS
|align=right |6
|align=right|22||align=right|8||align=right|7||align=right|7
|align=right|41||align=right|30||align=right|31
|quarter-final
|
|-
|2009
|TS
|align=right |7
|align=right|22||align=right|8||align=right|6||align=right|8
|align=right|39||align=right|38||align=right|30
|semi-final
|
|-
|2010
|TS
|align=right |7
|align=right|22||align=right|8||align=right|5||align=right|9
|align=right|34||align=right|29||align=right|29
|3rd round
|
|-
|2011
|TS
|align=right |8
|align=right|22||align=right|6||align=right|5||align=right|11
|align=right|28||align=right|37||align=right|23
|quarter-final
|
|-
|2012 
|TS
|align=right |7
|align=right|22||align=right|7||align=right|5||align=right|10
|align=right|41||align=right|41||align=right|26
|3rd round
|
|-
|2013 
|TS
|align=right |10
|align=right|22||align=right|6||align=right|3||align=right|13
|align=right|29||align=right|50||align=right|21
|quarter-final
|
|-
|2014 
|TS
|align=right |9
|align=right|22||align=right|8||align=right|2||align=right|12
|align=right|32||align=right|45||align=right|26
|quarter-final
|
|-
|2015 
|TS
|align=right |6
|align=right|22||align=right|8||align=right|6||align=right|8
|align=right|36||align=right|46||align=right|30
|3rd round
|
|-
|2016 
|TS
|align=right |10
|align=right|22||align=right|6||align=right|2||align=right|14
|align=right|32||align=right|49||align=right|20
|3rd round
|
|-
|2017
|TS
|align=right |4
|align=right|22||align=right|12||align=right|4||align=right|6
|align=right|34||align=right|24||align=right|40
|quarter-final
|
|-
|2018 
|TS
|align=right bgcolor=silver|2
|align=right|22||align=right|15||align=right|3||align=right|4
|align=right|39||align=right|21||align=right|48
|semi-final
|
|-
|2019 
|TS
|align=right bgcolor=cc9966|3
|align=right|22||align=right|14||align=right|2||align=right|6
|align=right|48||align=right|19||align=right|44
|3rd round
|
|-
|2020
|TS
|align=right |7
|align=right|18||align=right|5||align=right|3||align=right|10
|align=right|19||align=right|33||align=right|18
|1st round
|
|-
|2021
|TS
|align=right bgcolor="#FFCCCC"| 10
|align=right|18||align=right|2||align=right|1||align=right|15
|align=right|12||align=right|53||align=right|7
|quarter-final
|Relegated
|}

Players

Current squad

Former players

Honours
1. divisjon/Eliteserien/Toppserien
Champions (1): 1987
Runners-up (2): 1988, 2018
Third (6): 1986, 1989, 1990, 1997, 1999, 2019
 Norwegian Women's Cup
Winners (1): 1989
Runners-up (3): 1987, 1996, 1997

References

External links
Official site - football
Official site - women's football

Football clubs in Norway
Association football clubs established in 1919
Sport in Rogaland
1919 establishments in Norway
Klepp
Defunct athletics clubs in Norway